Josef "Yossele" Rosenblatt (May 9, 1882 – June 19, 1933) was a Ukrainian-born chazzan (cantor) and composer. He was regarded as the greatest cantor of his time.

Biography
Rosenblatt was born on May 9, 1882, in Bila Tserkva, Russian Empire. The scion of a long line of cantors, Rosenblatt's devoutly religious upbringing prevented him from receiving formal musical training at any of the great academies of his day. He began his career as a member of the local synagogue choir. Quickly lauded as a "wunderkind", or child prodigy, Rosenblatt's solo career was launched. At the age of 7, he moved with his family to Sadigora, Bukovina (Austria).

When he was 17 years old, Rosenblatt went to Vienna for several months, during which he officiated in the largest synagogues of the city. He informally studied with Jacob Maerz, an accomplished singer and musician as well as a wealthy merchant. Rosenblatt's stay in Vienna was followed by an extensive tour of the communities of the Austro-Hungarian empire including Budapest.

At 18 he married Taube Kaufman and accepted his first full-time position at the Chasidic community of Munkacs, Hungary. Shortly afterwards, in 1901, he relocated to Pressburg (Bratislava). Five years later he occupied a position in Hamburg, Germany. In 1912, he moved to Harlem to take a position at the Ohab Zedek orthodox congregation. In August 1927, he left his position at the Ohab Zedek congregation. During the following High Holy Days, he led the services in a hall in Chicago and, on Sukkot, in Detroit. During the succeeding months, he traveled throughout the United States, leading services in cities such as Minneapolis, Seattle, Indianapolis, Columbus, Milwaukee, Philadelphia and Washington, D.C. In Washington, D.C., he met with then-President Calvin Coolidge. In 1928, he signed a 10-year contract with First Congregation Anshe Sfard, located in Borough Park, Brooklyn.

Rosenblatt's fame extended beyond the Jewish world earning him large concert fees, a singing role in the 1927 film The Jazz Singer, and the sobriquet "The Jewish Caruso".

Bankruptcy
In the early 1920s, Rosenblatt was approached by two men who wanted to start a new Jewish newspaper in New York – they asked him to be a part of the enterprise. It excited him. He thought it would lead to a lot of money and at last financial freedom, so he signed on. But by signing on, he signed on as what appears to be a guarantor of the financial success of the venture. It was not financially successful, Rosenblatt used up his savings as well as a lot of his current income, but the creditors kept gaining on him.

In January 1925, the  failure of the newspaper venture forced Yossele Rosenblatt to file for bankruptcy. Although legally freed of most of his debts, he vowed to repay them anyway.

Israel
Rosenblatt was then offered a chance to participate in the making of a film in Mandatory Palestine. Although payment would depend again on the financial success of the film, he decided to take another chance. For one thing, it would get him away from his creditors, and for another, it would allow him to see Palestine, where he had never been.

With his wife and two youngest children (some of his older children were adults, and they took in their other younger siblings to permit their parents to travel), he went to Palestine, where he decided he would stay, although he apparently was not sure he could support himself in this small colony.

Death
He died of a heart attack at the age of 51 on June 19, 1933, in Jerusalem.

Style

He was known for his extraordinary technique, for the sweetness of his timbre, and for his unique ability to transition from normal voice to falsetto with hardly any noticeable break at all.

His technique in cantillation was unique. Notes were hit remarkably accurately at high speeds. Fiorituras, similarly, were struck near perfectly, both rhythmically and on pitch. His fame spread so far that Toscanini appealed to him to sing the leading role in Fromental Halévy's La Juive, but Rosenblatt replied that he would only use his vocal gift for the glory of God, in service to his religion. Notably, he turned down a "golden hello" from the Chicago opera house because it violated his religious principles.

Rosenblatt corresponded with many of the great tenors of his day. It is told that upon hearing Rosenblatt sing "Elli Elli", Enrico Caruso was so moved that he ascended the stage and kissed him.

Legacy
Rosenblatt perhaps exerted the greatest influence on cantorial music's "Golden Age". He led the transition from the more freestyling cadenza-laden approach prevalent before his era to a more structured, metered style. Rosenblatt pioneered the use of several cantorial techniques which have subsequently been adopted by cantors around the world. These include his trademark krekhts, or sob in which he would deliberately allow his voice to crack to convey the emotion of what he was singing. He also developed a realistic soprano falsetto as a method of easing the strain on his overworked voice. A prolific composer, more than one hundred and eighty pieces of his have been preserved.

Rosenblatt's great-grandsons include Rabbi Dr. Jonathan Rosenblatt of the Riverdale Jewish Center and Rabbi Andrew Rosenblatt of Congregation Schara Tzedeck in Vancouver.

Since the 78 RPM era, Rosenblatt's recordings have been re-issued many times in LP and CD format. In recent years, a set of 3 CDs Od Yosef Chai containing restored versions of 78s of Rosenblatt's performances has been issued by Mostly Music and Galpaz Music, a Brooklyn record store.

Rosenblatt's records and singing were featured in the 2009 drama A Serious Man.

External links

 Yossele Rosenblatt, Selected Recitatives (sheet music)
 David Olivestone: Standing Room Only. The Remarkable Career of Cantor Yossele Rosenblatt
 First Chazzanut Online article on "Yosef (Yossele) Rosenblatt"
 Second Chazzanut Online article on "Yosef (Yossele) Rosenblatt"
 "The Man with the $50,000 Beard: How a cantor became an American music legend"
 Josef Rosenblatt recordings at the Discography of American Historical Recordings.
Yossele Rosenblatt's Bankruptcy

References

1882 births
1933 deaths
Jewish American musicians
Hazzans
American male composers
20th-century American composers
Columbia Records artists
Ukrainian Jews
American Orthodox Jews
American people of Ukrainian-Jewish descent
American emigrants to Israel
People from Bila Tserkva
Burials at the Jewish cemetery on the Mount of Olives
Jewish Israeli musicians
People from Borough Park, Brooklyn
20th-century American singers
20th-century American male singers
Jewish Ukrainian musicians